The 2010 Belarusian First League is the 20th season of 2nd level football in Belarus. It started on April 17 and ended on November 13, 2010.

Team changes from 2009 season
The winners of last season (Belshina Bobruisk) were promoted to Belarusian Premier League. Due to reduction of Premier League, the promoted team was replaced by three teams that finished at the bottom of 2009 Belarusian Premier League table (Gomel, Granit Mikashevichi and Smorgon). The First League was expanded from 14 to 16 teams.

One team that finished at the bottom of 2009 season table (Spartak Shklov) relegated to the Second League. They were replaced by one best team of 2009 Second League (Rudensk).

Teams and venues

League table

Promotion play-offs
The 11th placed team of 2010 Premier League Torpedo Zhodino played a two-legged relegation play-off against the runners-up of 2010 Belarusian First League SKVICH Minsk for one spot in the 2011 Premier League. Torpedo Zhodino won the play-off 3–1 on aggregate and both teams retained their spots in respective leagues.

Results

Top goalscorers

Updated to games played on 13 November 2010 Source: football.by

See also
2010 Belarusian Premier League
2009–10 Belarusian Cup
2010–11 Belarusian Cup

External links
 Official site 

Belarusian First League seasons
2
Belarus
Belarus